John Mickel (born 28 January 1971) is a British professional stock car racing driver and commentator. He has raced in the NASCAR Craftsman Truck Series in the United States and the Pickup Truck Racing Series in the United Kingdom. He was also a commentator for Sky Sports' coverage of NASCAR racing in 2008 and 2009.

Racing career
Mickel, a second-generation driver, began racing at the age of ten in Ministox and won his first championship two years later. He soon moved to Superstox where he was named both World and European champion. He joined the SCSA-Europe tour in its inaugural year in 2001, where he won the series' first championship.

In 2002, Mickel began racing part-time in the United States in NASCAR. After failing to qualify for two races in the Craftsman Truck Series in the No. 09 for Midgley Racing, he began racing in the American Speed Association in 2004. He also planned to make his Nextel Cup Series debut that same year in Travis Carter's No. 66 car for the renamed TorqueSpeed Carter team in select races throughout the season, but the deal fell through. In 2005, Mickel returned to the Truck Series and did make his debut in the series after qualifying for the race at Texas, driving the No. 4 Dodge Ram for Bobby Hamilton Racing, starting 35th and finishing 29th. Mickel had attempted to make one other start that season for Hamilton's team at Atlanta in the team's No. 05 truck, but failed to qualify, in part because it was a fifth part-time team for BHR with no owner points. The next season, he ran the final five races of the Truck Series schedule leasing owner's points and equipment from the No. 07 Green Light Racing Chevrolet. His best finish was a 20th at Atlanta. He was scheduled to run with Green Light full-time in 2007, but instead Tim Sauter got the ride. During preseason testing at Daytona International Speedway, Speed had reported that Mickel would instead begin the season in the No. 63 MB Motorsports truck, and the sponsorship he brought would allow him and the team to run the full season, but this did not end up happening.

For 2008 and 2009, Mickel raced in selected rounds of the U.K. Pickup Truck Racing Series. He ran the multi-race winning truck of Paul Poulter but with a different engine.

On 31 January 2010, Mickel  won the inaugural ASA Transcontinental Series Free State 500 at Phakisa Freeway near Welkom, South Africa in a Chevrolet Monte Carlo, having qualified fourth for the 207-lap 500-km race. He took the lead on the last lap after a close and clean race.

In March 2010, Mickel (as Mickel Motorsport) started the 2010 UK CPC Legends Cars season in car No. 4, also running car No. 14 (the CPC sponsored car, driven by Paul Musselle) and car #39 (driven by Jess Gwynne).

On 28 March 2010, it was announced that Mickel would make his NASCAR comeback, returning to the Truck Series again with the TorqueSpeed team, but running by themselves instead of partnering with SS-Green Light or another existing team. No other details were announced besides the fact that the team would run a part-time schedule of around ten races that year with a full season run planned in 2011. This also never ended up happening, and Mickel would not make another start in NASCAR.

Career history
2019          Legends Racing UK - 3rd place
2018          Legends Racing UK - Champion (becomes UK career top points scorer)
2017          Legends Racing UK - Champion
2016          Legends Racing UK - Champion
2015          Legends Racing UK - Champion
2013          Legends Racing UK - 2nd place
2012          Legends Racing UK - 3rd place
2011          Legends Racing UK
2010          CPC Legends Racing UK - 4th Placed Overall
2006          NASCAR Craftsman Truck SS-Green Light Racing
2005          NASCAR Craftsman Truck Atlanta Motorspeedway Texas Motorway Speedway
2004          ASA races Charlotte & Atlanta Raced British built SCSA car (shipped from the UK)
2001-2006   SCSA-Europe Inaugural Champion in 2001
1999-2001  Legends Car Championships Champion - World and British Legends Cars Champion - World Series Legends Cars World Legends Champion (Sears Point, CA)

Motorsports career results

NASCAR
(key) (Bold – Pole position awarded by qualifying time. Italics – Pole position earned by points standings or practice time. * – Most laps led.)

Craftsman Truck Series

References

External links

Driver Profile at Mickel Motorsport
Driver Profile at TorqueSpeed

1971 births
American Speed Association drivers
English racing drivers
Living people
NASCAR drivers
Sportspeople from Cambridge
ASCAR drivers